Redstone is a residential neighbourhood in the northeast quadrant of Calgary, Alberta, Canada. Located near the north edge of the city, it is bounded by Métis Trail N.E. to the west, Stoney Trail to the north, 60 Street N.E. to the east, and  128 Ave N.E., the Skyview Ranch community to the south.

Redstone is located within Calgary City Council's Ward 5.

Demographics 
Redstone was not yet populated as of the City of Calgary's 2012 municipal census.

See also
List of neighbourhoods in Calgary

References 

Neighbourhoods in Calgary